Chuk may refer to:

 Chuk (instrument), the traditional Korean musical instrument
 CHUK, the Conserved helix-loop-helix ubiquitous kinase (also known as IKKα or IKK1)
 Chuk, Iran, a village in Kurdistan Province, Iran
 Çük (also spelled Chuk or Chuek), the Idel-Ural festival
 Chuk, alternative transliteration of jook (congee)* Cantonese surname of Zhù (surname) 祝

See also
 Chok (disambiguation)